Semenic is a ski resort in the Semenic-Cheile Carașului National Park, in the Banat region of Romania.

Etymology
The semenic is actually a rare flower growing in the wilderness of the mountains. Therefore, this western Romanian ski resort was named after it, as a tribute to the rareness of the beauty that one can discover within this unique location.

Geography
The resort is located on the Semenic Mountain, which is a part of the Banat Mountains in Caraș-Severin County. Semenic is situated on top of Mount Semenic at an altitude of 1,400m, about 36 km away from the county capital, Reșița. It is a fact that on Mount Semenic, in comparison with the other ski resorts of Romania, the snow gets the thickest throughout the year, frequently reaching a layer thickness above 2 m, that stretches the ski season up to the end of April, and sometimes even May.

Skiing
There are 3 main slopes: the Debutanților slope, sometimes ironically called also Idioților ("Idiots'"), which is most affordable and shortest (about 200m); Goznuta I and II, which have each about 500m, not very hard (international code: blue-red) and the medium difficult slopes of Cucea Brazilor I and II. A newer built slope is situated on the western part of the resort, just under Piatra Goznei peak (red code). This slope is a little bit further (about 600m, which in winter may be quite a distance, considering the thick layer of snow and strong winds), and its start point is 1800m high. All the above slopes are serviced by 3 different ski-lifts. Since mid-February 2011, one may buy daily and weekend ski-passes (VSD), valid for all the slopes.
The newest slope is Valiug, and it is almost 6 km long, descending among the evergreen trees to Vǎliug village. A bus is servicing this slope every 30 minutes from Vǎliug. New facilities are to come soon, as the resort is planned to have artificial snow machines and up to 15 km of slopes by 2012. 
For the 2012 season a new facility is intended on the Northern slope to Garana, and is expected to be open up to the end of May each year.
Open hours: 9h-17h daily.
There are enough accommodation facilities (2** and 3***) on the spot (Romanian "cazare"), or in the nearby villages: the cozy "pensiune"s in Gǎrâna Wolfsberg, Trei Ape, Brebu, etc.

Wolfsberg
Down-slope from the Semenic resort there is Gǎrâna, once known as Wolfsberg, that stands out with its specific architecture. Situated at an altitude of 935 m, the village is surrounded by a landscape dominated by the grand silhouette of the Semenic Mountain. Every year, in the month of August, the Gǎrâna (Wolfsberg) hosts The International GARANA Jazz Festival. The Woodstock=like jazz-camp has a modern restaurant and other accommodation facilities. Nearby, one may visit the permanent Garana International Sculpture Park (open year-round).

External links
 Semenic National Park

Banat
Geography of Caraș-Severin County
Ski areas and resorts in Romania
Southern Carpathians
Tourist attractions in Caraș-Severin County